was a ministry of the Japanese government.

It managed 849 public corporations before its 2001 merger. It merged into the Ministry of Land, Infrastructure, Transport and Tourism (MLIT) in January 2001.

References

External links
 
  

 
Transport organizations based in Japan
T
Japan
Ministries disestablished in 2001
2001 disestablishments in Japan